Society of the Army of Santiago de Cuba was an organization, the purpose of which was to record the history and conserve the memory of the events of the campaign which resulted in the surrender, on July 17, 1898, of the Spanish army, the city of Santiago de Cuba, and the military province to which it pertained during the Spanish–American War.

Founding
Organized in the Governor's Palace, Santiago de Cuba, July 31, 1898.

Constitution adopted at Camp Wykoff, Long Island, N. Y., September 15, 1898.

Membership
The membership of the Society shall consist of all officers and soldiers of the United States Army (including Acting Assistant Surgeons and authorized Volunteer Aides), who constituted the expeditionary force to Santiago de Cuba and who worthily participated in the campaign between the dates of June 14 and July 17, 1898, and who shall signify their wish for membership by making application and paying the dues.

There shall be three classes of membership, namely: First, Original Members; Second, Members by Inheritance, to consist of lineal male descendants of Original Members; and, Third, Members by Succession, to consist of those male blood relatives of the first or second class to whom in the absence of lineal descendants the right of inheritance to one (1) membership may be devised by decedent members. Members by inheritance shall include those who are lineal male descendants of any officer or enlisted man now deceased who was killed or died of wounds received or disease contracted in the line of duty in the Santiago campaign and who, had he survived, would have been eligible to membership.

Honorary membership shall be conferred upon all duly accredited Military and Naval Attaches of foreign governments who were present on land in Cuba with the Fifth Army Corps at any time during the Santiago campaign. Honorary members shall be exempt from the payment of dues, and shall not be entitled to vote.

Officers
PRESIDENT:

Major-General WM. R. SHAFTER, U. S. V.

FIRST VICE-PRESIDENT:

Major-General JOSEPH WHEELER, U. S. V.

SECOND VICE-PRESIDENT:

Major-General J. FORD KENT, U. S. V.

THIRD VICE-PRESIDENT:

Major-General H. W. LAWTON, U. S. V. (Killed in action at San Mateo, P. I., December 18, 1899)

FOURTH VICE-PRESIDENT:

Major-General JOHN C. BATES, U. S. V.

SECRETARY AND TREASURER:

Major ALFRED C. SHARPE, Assistant Adjutant-General, U. S. V.

HISTORIAN:

Major G. CREIGHTON WEBB, Inspector-General, U. S. V.

REGISTRAR GENERAL:

Major PHILIP READE, Inspector-general, U. S. V.

FIRST DIVISION REGISTRAR:

Capt. L. W. V. KENNON, 6TH U, S. Infantry.

SECOND DIVISION REGISTRAR:

Capt. JAMES T. KERR, 17TH U. S. Infantry.

THIRD DIVISION REGISTRAR:

Capt. CHARLES MORTON, 3rd U. S. Cavalry.

FOURTH DIVISION REGISTRAR:

Lt. Col. JOHN JACOB ASTOR, Inspector-General, U. S. V.

Members of Council

1 Major-General S. B. M. YOUNG, U. S. V.

2 Major-General H. S. HAWKINS, U. S. V.

3 Major-general A. R. CHAFFEE, U. S. V.

4 Major-General WM. LUDLOW, U. S. V.

5 Major-General S. S. SUMNER, U. S. V.

6 Brig.-General ADELBERT AMES, U. S. V.

7 Brig.-General WALLACE F. RANDOLPH, U. S. V.

8 Brig.-General CHAMBERS McKIBBIN, U. S. V.

9 Col. THEODORE ROOSEVELT, 1st U. S. Vol. Cav.

10 Lt.-Col. JOHN DAVID MILEY, Inspector-general, U. S. V. (Died at Manila, P. I., September 19, 1899)

See also
United Spanish War Veterans

Spanish War Service Medal

Spanish Campaign Medal

References
ARMY OF SANTIAGO SOCIETY.; Gen. Joseph Wheeler Presided at the Inaugural Meeting and Gen. Shafter Was Present, The New York Times August 23, 1898.
The constitution and by-laws of the Society of the army of Santiago de Cuba: With an historical sketch, Society of the Army of Santiago de Cuba, Press of W.F.Roberts, 1900.
Lossing, Benson John, Harper's encyclopædia of United States history from 458 A.D. to 1906, Volume 8, Harper & brothers, 1905.
Phillips, Sydney Aaron, Patriotic societies of the United States and their lapel insignia, Broadway publishing company, 1914.

Spanish–American War
1898 in Cuba
American veterans' organizations
United States military support organizations
Mutual organizations